Samota is a surname. Notable people with the surname include:

 Angela Samota (1964–1984), American murder victim
 Paramjeet Samota (born 1988), Indian boxer

See also